Dexter Raymond Mills Jr., better known by his stage name Consequence, is an American rapper from Queens, New York City, New York. He is best known for his collaborative work with A Tribe Called Quest and Kanye West.

Career
Consequence debuted in 1996, appearing several times on A Tribe Called Quest's fourth album Beats, Rhymes, and Life, as he is the cousin of member Q-Tip. In March 2007, he released his debut album Don't Quit Your Day Job!, under Columbia Records and Kanye West's GOOD Music. Consequence left GOOD Music in 2011, on bad terms, after being signed with the label since 2005. He and West later reconciled, despite Consequence speaking ill of West. Consequence consequently launched his own record label, Band Camp Records, following his departure from GOOD Music.

Personal life 
In 2020, Consequence came forth about his battle with lupus.

Discography

Studio albums

Mixtapes
The Cons Vol. 1: All Sales Are Final (2002)
The Cons Vol. 2: Make The Game Come To You (2003)
Take 'Em To The Cleaners (2004)
A Tribe Called Quence (1995-2004) (2005)
The Cons Vol. 3: Da Comeback Kid (2005)
The Cons Vol. 4: Finish What You Started (2006)
The Wait Is Over Vol. 1: The Best Of The Cons (2006)
The Cons Vol. 5: Refuse 2 Die (2007)
Movies on Demand (2010)
Movies on Demand II (2011)
Movies on Demand III (2011)
Curb Certified (2011)
Movies on Demand IV (2013)

Singles

As featured artist

Notes

Guest appearances
A Tribe Called Quest – "The Chase, Part II" on Award Tour 12" single B-side (1993)
A Tribe Called Quest – "Glamour and Glitz" on The Show soundtrack (1995)
A Tribe Called Quest – "Phony Rappers", "Motivators", "Jam", "Mind Power", "Baby Phife's Return", "Word Play", "Stressed Out" on Beats, Rhymes and Life (1996)
Kanye West – "Spaceship" on The College Dropout (2004)
Common – "They Say" (Alternate version) (2005)
Rell – "Real Love" (2004)
Kanye West – "Electric Relaxation" (Freshmen Adjustment) (2005)
Kanye West – "Gone" on Late Registration (2005)
Miri Ben-Ari – "I've Been Waiting on You" on The Hip-Hop Violinist (2005)
Consequence – "Couped Up" feat. DJ Swivel & Chris Stylez on DJ Whoo Kid – BET Awards Mixtape '06, Clinton Sparks – The Cons Vol. 4 (2006)
 Talib Kweli – "Engine Runnin'" on Liberation (2006)
 Kanye West – "The Good, The Bad, and the Ugly" on Prelude to Graduation Mixtape (2007)
 Kanye West – "Don't Forget 'Em" on "Can't Tell Me Nothing" (2007)
 Beyoncé – "Suga Mama (Remix)" (2007)
 Statik Selektah – "Express Yourself" (with Termanology & Talib Kweli) (2007)
 Statik Selektah – "Mr Popularity" (2008)
 AZ – "Heavy in da Game" (2008)
 Kid Cudi – "Buggin' Out 2009" (2009)
 Nefew – "Biko" on Homesick (2009)
 Kanye West – "Chain Heavy" on G.O.O.D. Fridays (2010)
 Statik Selektah – "Life Is Short" (2010)
 Beyoncé – "Party" (production with Kanye West) on 4 (2011)
 Son of Light – "Love & Hate" (2012)
 A Tribe Called Quest – "Whateva Will Be", "Mobius" (with Busta Rhymes), "Black Spasmodic", "The Killing Season" (with Kanye West and Talib Kweli) – We Got It from Here... Thank You 4 Your Service (2016)
 Danny Brown – "Combat" (with Q-Tip) – U Know What I'm Sayin? (2019)

Filmography

References

Living people
African-American male rappers
African-American record producers
Record producers from New York (state)
African-American songwriters
East Coast hip hop musicians
Musicians from Queens, New York
People from St. Albans, Queens
Rappers from New York City
Songwriters from New York (state)
Columbia Records artists
Participants in American reality television series
21st-century American rappers
21st-century American male musicians
21st-century African-American musicians
American male songwriters
1977 births